Vinnamangalam is a village in Tirupathur district of Tamil Nadu State, India. Alankuppam, Kannadikuppam, Periyankuppam, Veerankuppam, Nacharkuppam are the nearby villages within 1–2 km radius. Tamil is the local language in the village. Kennedy College Of Hotel Management And Catering Technology (a self-financed polytechnic) is located in Agaramcheri, nearby Vinnamangalam. Vinnamangalam and Ambur train stations are the nearby railway stations to Vinnamangalam. However, Katpadi junction is the major railway station 59 km near to Vinnamangalam.

Temples,

Sridevi Bhoomadevi samethe Sri Amarntha Sundhararaja Perumal Kovil

References 

Villages in Tirupathur district